The Franklin Institute Awards (or Benjamin Franklin Medal) is an American science and engineering award presented by the Franklin Institute, a science museum in Philadelphia. The Franklin Institute awards comprises the Benjamin Franklin Medals in seven areas of science and engineering, the Bower Awards and Prize for Achievement in Science, and the Bower Award for Business Leadership. Since 1824, the institute has recognized "world-changing scientists, engineers, inventors, and industrialists—all of whom reflect Benjamin Franklin’s spirit of curiosity, ingenuity, and innovation". Some of the noted past laureates include Nikola Tesla, Thomas Edison, Marie Curie, Max Planck, Albert Einstein, Stephen Hawking.  Some of the 21st century laureates of the institute awards are Bill Gates, James P. Allison, Indra Nooyi, Jane Goodall, Elizabeth Blackburn, George Church, Robert S. Langer, and Alex Gorsky.

Benjamin Franklin Medals 
In 1998, the Benjamin Franklin Medals were created by reorganizing all of the endowed medals presented by The Franklin Institute at that time, into a group of medals recognizing seven areas of study: Chemistry, Computer and Cognitive Science, Earth and Environmental Science, Electrical Engineering, Life Science, Mechanical Engineering, and Physics. The first Benjamin Franklin Medals were presented in 1998.

Medalists are selected by a Committee on Science and the Arts (CS&A), composed of local academics and professionals from the Philadelphia area.

Bower Awards 
The Bower Award and Prize for Achievement in Science and the Bower Award for Business Leadership are the newest awards, established by a $7.5 million bequest from Henry Bower in 1988.  The annual Bower Prizes are US$250,000 each.

Former awards

Elliott Cresson Medal
Frank P. Brown Medal
Franklin Medal
George R. Henderson Medal
Howard N. Potts Medal
John Price Wetherill Medal
John Scott Medal
Stuart Ballantine Medal

List of laureates

The following table lists laureates of the Benjamin Franklin Medal (including the Bower Prizewinners), from 1998 onwards.

See also 

 List of general science and technology awards

References

External links
The Franklin Institute. Winners. Benjamin Franklin Medal winners.
 YouTube playlist of all Franklin Institute Award Winners

American science and technology awards